Liubchenko or Lyubchenko is a Ukrainian surname. Notable people with the surname include:

 Igor Liubchenko (born 1991), Ukrainian Muay Thai fighter
 Oleksiy Liubchenko (born 1971), Ukrainian politician
 Panas Lyubchenko (1897–1937), Ukrainian and Soviet politician

Ukrainian-language surnames